The 1979 NCAA Division II Soccer Championship was the eighth annual tournament held by the NCAA to determine the top men's Division II college soccer program in the United States.

Alabama A&M defeated Eastern Illinois in the final, 2–0, to win their second national title. This was the Bulldogs' third consecutive appearance in the Division II championship match after winning in 1977 and losing in 1978.

The final was played at Florida International University in Miami, Florida on December 1, 1979.

Bracket

Final

See also  
 1979 NCAA Division I Soccer Tournament
 1979 NCAA Division III Soccer Championship
 1979 NAIA Soccer Championship

References 

NCAA Division II Men's Soccer Championship
NCAA Division II Men's Soccer Championship
NCAA Division II Men's Soccer Championship
NCAA Division II Men's Soccer Championship
Soccer in Florida